Sir Henry Victor Alpin MacKinnon Raikes KBE (19 January 1901 – 18 April 1986) was a British Conservative politician.

Raikes was the son of  Henry St. John Digby Raikes, eldest son of Henry Cecil Raikes. His mother was Annie Lucinda (née Mackinnon). Educated at Westminster School and Trinity College, Cambridge, he unsuccessfully contested Ilkeston in 1924 and 1929 before being elected for South East Essex in 1931. During World War II he served as a flight lieutenant in the Royal Air Force.

In 1945 Raikes was elected as Member of Parliament (MP) for Liverpool Wavertree. In 1950, 1951, and 1955 he was elected for  Liverpool Garston. He left office in 1957 and was replaced by Richard Martin Bingham in a by-election.

References

Sources
Times Guide to the House of Commons

External links
 

1901 births
1986 deaths
Conservative Party (UK) MPs for English constituencies
UK MPs 1931–1935
UK MPs 1935–1945
UK MPs 1945–1950
UK MPs 1950–1951
UK MPs 1951–1955
UK MPs 1955–1959
Alumni of Trinity College, Cambridge
People educated at Westminster School, London
Royal Air Force officers
Royal Air Force personnel of World War II
Knights Commander of the Order of the British Empire
Members of the Parliament of the United Kingdom for Liverpool constituencies
Politicians awarded knighthoods
Members of the Parliament of the United Kingdom for South East Essex